Jim Smith may refer to:

Arts and entertainment
Jim Smith (animator) (born 1954), Texan animator and co-writer on The Ren and Stimpy Show
Jim Cooray Smith (born 1978), British writer of directorial critical biographies and television guides, also involved with the Kaldor City series
Jim Field Smith (born 1979), British film director, comedy writer, and actor
Jim Smith (author), British author, illustrator and designer
Jim Smith (bassist), bass guitarist of Cardiacs

Politics
Jim Smith (Indiana politician), member of the Indiana State Senate
Jim Smith (Nebraska politician) (born 1959), member of the Nebraska Legislature
Jim Smith (New Mexico politician) member of the New Mexico Legislature and Bernalillo County Commission
Jim Smith (Nova Scotia politician) (1935–2020), former MLA and cabinet minister in Nova Scotia, Canada

Sports

Footballers
Jim Smith (footballer, born 1937) (1937–2002), Scottish football player (Preston North End)
Jim Smith (footballer, born 1940) (1940–2019), English football player and manager
Jim Smith (Cavan Gaelic footballer) (1901–1970), Irish Gaelic footballer
Jim Smith (Louth Gaelic footballer) (1887–1951), Irish Gaelic footballer
Jim Smith (footballer, born 1887) (1887–?), Australian rules footballer who played with South Melbourne
Jim Smith (footballer, born 1947), Australian rules footballer who played with Hawthorn
Jim Ray Smith (born 1932), American football player
Jim Smith (defensive back) (born 1946), former American football defensive back in the National Football League for the Washington Redskins

Other sports
Jim Smith (baseball coach) (died 2001), LSU Tigers baseball head coach 1966–1978
Jim Smith (basketball coach) (born 1934), college basketball head coach
Jim Smith (basketball, born 1958), former NBA player
Jim Smith (catcher), Negro league baseball player
Jim Smith (cricketer, born 1906) (1906–1979), English cricketer
Jim Smith (cricketer, born 1940), New Zealand cricketer
Jim Smith (ice hockey, born 1957), (born 1957), President of USA Hockey
Jim Smith (ice hockey, born 1964), Canadian ice hockey player
Jim Smith (second baseman), Negro league baseball player
Jim Smith (shortstop) (born 1954), major league infielder who played for the Pittsburgh Pirates in the 1982 season
Jim Smith (wide receiver) (born 1955), former NFL and USFL wide receiver

Others
Jim Smith (racing businessman), owner of Ultra Motorsports
Jim Smith (business executive), CEO of Thomson Reuters
Jim Cuthbert Smith (born 1954), scientist

See also
James Smith (disambiguation)
Jimmy Smith (disambiguation)